Field Guide: Northern Vehicles 2 is a 1996 role-playing game supplement for Heavy Gear published by Dream Pod 9.

Contents
Field Guide: Northern Vehicles 2 has a spread of old and new vehicles detailed with tech specs, variants, full record sheets, and illustrations.

Reception
Jim Swallow reviewed Field Guide: Northern Vehicles 2 for Arcane magazine, rating it a 5 out of 10 overall. Swallow comments that "For the most part, the Field Guides are of the most use to wargamers using the Heavy Gear background, while roleplayers will likely see the mecha showcased here in the hands of NPCs and the enemy.  Like most of the Heavy Gear material currently available, the books are produced with an eye to clarity and careful precision, and with a degree of modularity which means they don't have to be an essential purchase."

References

Heavy Gear
Role-playing game supplements introduced in 1996
Science fiction role-playing game supplements